This is a list of association football clubs in Wallis and Futuna.

Ahoa
Alele
Association Sportive Aka’aka
Association Sportive Uvea
Central Sport 
Falaleu
Faletolu
 Fatima
Fetuuao
Galu  
Haafuasia
Haatofo
Halalo
Jeunesse Sportive de Mua
Kolesio 
Kolopopo
Laione
Liku 
Lomipeau
Maile 
Mata Lose
Mata'utu FC 
Mata'utu
Nukuhione
Pacifique 
Pulotu
Santé Sport
Teesi 
Tepa
Utufua
Vaitupu
Vaivevela

Wallis and Futuna
Football clubs

Football clubs